Athisayam is an amusement theme park located in Paravai on Madurai - Dindigul National Highway 7, 12 km from Madurai. The park is located on a  site and features about 4 games and 2 water rides. The park is popular for its water rides, recreating the experience of Courtalam waterfalls.

External links 

Official website

References 

Tourist attractions in Madurai
Amusement parks in Tamil Nadu
Buildings and structures in Madurai
Year of establishment missing